The flag of Yemen ( Alam al-Yaman) was adopted on May 22, 1990, the day that North Yemen and South Yemen were unified. The flag is essentially the Arab Liberation Flag of 1952, introduced after the Egyptian Revolution of 1952 in which Arab nationalism was a dominant theme. The Arab Liberation Flag of 1952 served as the inspiration for the flags of both North and South Yemen prior to unification, as well as for the current flags of Egypt, Iraq, Sudan, Palestine and Syria.

According to the official description, the red stands for unity and the bloodshed of martyrs, the white for a bright future, and the black for the supposed dark past. The flag is graphically identical to the flag of the Libyan Arab Republic from 1969 to 1972.

Historical flags
Before Yemen was unified into the present-day Republic of Yemen in 1990, it existed as two states, North and South Yemen.

North Yemen

After its independence from the Ottoman Empire, the Mutawakkilite Kingdom of Yemen used a red flag with a sword and stars for most of its existence, from 1927 to 1962. When it became the Yemen Arab Republic in 1962, the flag adopted the Arab Liberation colors with one green star in the center of the white band. The 1962 flag (with or without the star) is used by the supporters of the Houthi movement in parts of North Yemen.

South Yemen 

The flag of the People's Democratic Republic of Yemen in the South was the Arab Liberation Flag of 1952 with a sky-blue chevron with a red star (the emblem of the Yemeni Socialist Party) next to the hoist. The flag was adopted on 30 November 1967 when South Yemen declared independence from the United Kingdom until the Yemeni unification in 1990. It was used again for a few months in 1994 during the existence of the Democratic Republic of Yemen. Today, the South Yemeni flag is used by the separatist supporters from the Southern Movement and the Southern Transitional Council.

Federation of South Arabia

Eastern Yemen
The Protectorate of South Arabia consists of states located at the southern central tip of the Arabian Peninsula (Hadhramaut) under protection agreements with Britain. The states did not join the Federation of South Arabia. The protectorate became from southern Yemen after the Radfan uprising and the coup against the Sultans of the provinces. Now it is part of the Republic of Yemen.

Protectorate of South Arabia

Government flags

Region Flags

The federalization of Yemen or the Federal Republic of Yemen was the outcome of the National Dialogue Conference, the Dialogue members also agreed that Yemen would be transformed into a six-region federal system.  The regions would be Azal in the North, and Saba in the center, and Tihama in the West, and Aden and Jand in the South, and Hadramawt  in the East.

See also

Emblem of Yemen
Pan-Arabism
Pan-Arab colors
Flag of Egypt
Flag of Iraq
Flag of Sudan
Flag of Syria

References

External links

Flags introduced in 1990
Flag
Flags of Asia
Yemen
Flags of Yemen